The 1991 Texas A&M Aggies football team completed the season with a 10–2 record.  The Aggies had a regular season Southwest Conference record of 8-0 and were conference champions.  They ended the season with a 10–2 loss in the 1992 Cotton Bowl Classic to Florida State.

Schedule

Roster

Rankings

Game summaries

LSU
Greg Hill ran for 216 yards and 2 TDs on the way to a 45-7 rout of the LSU Tigers.  The Wrecking Crew held LSU to 31 net yards rushing in the game led by Quentin Coryatt and Chris Crooms who logged 8 tackles each.  Patrick Bates had 2 INTs as the Aggies crushed the Tigers in Kyle Field.  J Elliott was the 12th Man for the game.Official NCAA Scoresheet

Tulsa

Southwestern Louisiana

Texas Tech

Baylor

Houston

Rice

TCU

Arkansas
This was the final game played between Arkansas and Texas A&M until the 2009 rivalry renewal.

SMU

Texas

Florida State
Quentin Coryatt accounted for the only Aggie score with a safety sack of Casey Weldon in the first quarter.

References

Texas AandM
Texas A&M Aggies football seasons
Southwest Conference football champion seasons
Texas AandM Aggies football